Haplo may refer to:

 Haplogroup

Fish
Haplo (fish), a common name for many fish classified in the tribe Haplochromini
 Giant haplo
 Bluelip haplo
 Ncheni haplo

See also
Ploidy
The Death Gate Cycle